A by-election was held for the New South Wales Legislative Assembly electorate of Yass Plains on 15 September 1859 because Thomas Laidlaw resigned as he realised his role as deputy postmaster at Yass, on a salary of £20 a year, was an office of profit under the crown.

Dates

Result

Thomas Laidlaw resigned as he held the office of deputy postmaster at the time of his election.

See also
Electoral results for the district of Yass Plains
List of New South Wales state by-elections

References

1859 elections in Australia
New South Wales state by-elections
1850s in New South Wales